During the 2002–03 Dutch football season, AFC Ajax competed in the Eredivisie.

Season summary
Despite being the top scorers in the Eredivisie, Ajax were unable to defend their title and finished second. They also failed to retain the cup, but compensated by reaching the Champions League quarter-finals before being knocked out by eventual winners A.C. Milan.

First-team squad
Squad at end of season

Left club during season

Reserve squad

Transfers

In

Out
 Richard Knopper
 Fred Grim
 Ferdi Vierklau

Results

UEFA Champions League

Second group stage

References

AFC Ajax seasons
AFC Ajax